The 2013–14 Washington State Cougars women's basketball team represented Washington State University during the 2013–14 NCAA Division I women's basketball season. The cougars, led by seventh year head coach June Daugherty, played their games at the Beasley Coliseum and were members of the Pac-12 Conference. They finished the season with a record of 17–17 overall, 9–9 in Pac-12 play for a seventh place finish. They lost in the semifinals of the 2014 Pac-12 Conference women's basketball tournament to Oregon State. They were invited to the 2014 Women's National Invitation Tournament which they lost to Montana in the first round.

Roster

Schedule

|-
!colspan=9 | Exhibition

|-
!colspan=9 | Regular Season

|-
!colspan=9| 2014 Pac-12 Tournament

|-
!colspan=9| WNIT

See also
2013–14 Washington State Cougars men's basketball team

References

Washington State Cougars women's basketball seasons
Washington State
2014 Women's National Invitation Tournament participants
2013 in sports in Washington (state)
2014 in sports in Washington (state)